Landskap is common Scandinavian word which means landscape or province and can refer to:

Districts of Norway, the historical provinces of Norway
Provinces of Sweden, the historical provinces of Sweden and Finland
Historical provinces of Finland, the subset of historical provinces in current day Finland
Regions of Finland, the regions of Finland from 1997 till 2009
Åland, an autonomous and unilingually Swedish province of Finland

See also
 Län
 Lands of Sweden